Electresia is a genus of moths belonging to the subfamily Olethreutinae of the family Tortricidae.

Species
Electresia zalesskii Kuznetzov, 1941

See also
List of Tortricidae genera

References

External links
Tortricid.net

Olethreutinae
Tortricidae genera